CITV (short for Children's ITV or Children's Independent Television) is a British free-to-air children's television channel owned by ITV plc. It broadcasts content from the CITV archive and acquisitions, every day from 6 a.m. to 9 p.m. which was previously 6 a.m. to 6 p.m. until 21 February 2016. It is also the title of a programming block on the ITV network at weekends.

Children's ITV launched on 3 January 1983 as a late afternoon programming block on the ITV network for children aged 5–13. It replaced the earlier Watch It! branding and introduced networked in-vision continuity links between programmes. These links were originally pre-recorded from a small London studio, up until 1987 when Central won the contract to produce live links from their Birmingham studios. In 2004, presentation of CITV was relocated to Granada Television in Manchester, which saw the demise of in-vision continuity. Nine years later, the operations moved to ITV Granada's MediaCityUK studios in Salford.

In 2006, CITV launched as a digital channel on Freeview. The CITV channel averages around 100,000 viewers between 4 p.m.–6 p.m. every day. The CITV programming block on the ITV network airs on weekend mornings from 6 a.m. to 9:25 a.m. as part of the ITV Breakfast time slot. CITV does not have a +1 and HD simulcast, unlike the rest of ITV's portfolio of channels. In March 2023, it was announced that the CITV channel would be shut down later in the year, in favour of a children's hub on ITVX.

History

Watch It! and Children's ITV: Early years (1980–1989) 
Before being known as Children's ITV, the timeslot for children's programmes on the ITV Network was briefly branded as Watch It!. The Watch It! brand started on 29 December 1980 and was presented live by the duty continuity announcer in each ITV region.

The notion of networking children's continuity was first suggested within ITV as far back as the early 1970s, but with fierce regional identities prevalent – including scheduling, presentation and programming – the idea stalled until the late 1970s, when the IBA began to express concern that most ITV shows for children were not consistent or fully networked. On Thursdays, the ITV regions were able to broadcast whatever programmes they wished; many non-children's programmes appeared, such as Looney Tunes. In December 1980, ITV announced its first concerted effort at a more coherent approach to children's output, with the introduction of Watch It! each weekday from 4:15 p.m. to 5:15 p.m., after the IBA continued to emphasized issues.

Watch It! was conceived by the promotions department at ATV, with the implementation of the branding differed from region to region, thus it was always transmitted locally and never provided on a network basis. ATV provide different animations each season, to freshen up what was available to each company. Most regions, including Southern/TVS and Granada, would use their own station announcers during Watch It! airtime.

Shortly after the start of new franchises in 1982, some ITV stations raised concerns that Watch It! had not gone far enough to address previous concerns. Central's Controller of Children's Programmes, Lewis Rudd, suggested a different approach to the presentation method. As a result, the Central Promotions Department came up with the initial concept for Children's ITV. The new look was devised, and links between programmes were pre-recorded using presenters drawn from the constituent programmes. The networking arrangements were similar to those already in place for the transmission of schools programmes – the links were played out from Central and the component programmes came from the supplying companies.

Children's ITV went to air on Monday 3 January 1983, between 4 p.m. and 5:15 p.m. each weekday afternoon, the extra fifteen minutes being filled by a repeat of one of the pre-school programmes shown at lunchtime the same day. Initially featuring a different presenter each month (usually from children's television), the links were pre-recorded in advance in a small studio at a London facility called Molinare, using a single locked-off camera. The first set design was a rocket ship and was used for the first few months. The concept was eventually retired, and the set and style of presentation used began to reflect the presenter doing the presenting that month or the programme that he/she starred in (i.e. Pat Coombs as "The Dressmaker" from Yorkshire Television's Ragdolly Anna in a room of antiques in April 1984).

By 1985, the links were still being recorded, but using a common, stylized set known as Network Control, which allowed the presenter to be joined by guests in the studio for interviews. The exterior of this fictitious location also featured in the animations and stings. Technical considerations often left the system flawed. With each programme coming from a different playout source (usually from that of the originating ITV company, i.e. if the first programme was Rainbow, which came from Thames TV, the staff there would have to run the tape while the presenter was talking and wouldn't show Thames TV's skyline ident before the programme's titles) and each link being pre-recorded (played out by Central), things often went wrong on air: Programmes would be rolled early and the links would be cut short. Programmes would also fail to appear and the presenter would be left on screen. Because each link was recorded for the slot available, the presenter would hold the final pose for a few moments so that the transmission controller at Central had something to leave on screen just in case. Pre-recording the links also meant that late schedule changes could not be easily referenced.

In September 1985, the BBC revamped their own children's presentation with the introduction of "Children's BBC". Using the BBC1 announcer booth at BBC Television Centre, later dubbed "The Broom Cupboard", Phillip Schofield provided links between the programmes. This format of a small self-op continuity studio using one single presenter (and an occasional puppet) continued in largely the same format until 1993, but was broadcast live and allowed for a looser, more relaxed style of presentation than the rival ITV service.

Children's ITV went live in early June 1987. Using the small presentation studio at their Broad Street studios – which had become available since in-vision continuity for the Central region was dropped – former Central announcers Gary Terzza and Debbie Shore presented live links from a set built to look like a transmitting station. Although the studio space was small, the designers' use of a plate glass mirror gave the effect of a much larger set. The new live format gave brought a great deal of flexibility; timings could be altered, schedule changes reflected, and breakdowns dealt with in a continuous manner. In 1988, the format was refreshed again with a new single presenter, Mark Granger, replacing Terzza and Shore, in a smaller, more basic studio set which included in-vision monitors showing the VT clock of the next scheduled item.

The Stonewall Productions era (1989–1991) 
From 3 April 1989, the independent production company Stonewall Productions won the contract to produce Children's ITV presentation. Stonewall Productions was headed up by Michael Jackson, a Central staffer who used his expertise to prepare a suitable application.

Whereas Central had restricted links to the station's former in-vision presentation studio, Stonewall chose not to use a fixed set, but instead presented links from various areas of Central's headquarters at Broad Street in Birmingham, utilising a rotating team of presenters which included Clive Warren (now a DJ), Jeanne Downs (a singer), Jerry Foulkes (a producer who left Children's ITV on 22 December 1989), and a large puppet dog called Scally (who started out with Mark during his last few months).

Central regains control (1991–2001) 

Central won back the contract to produce the continuity links from 9 April 1991, choosing to revert links back to a small in-vision studio and using one regular presenter, Tommy Boyd. During the 1991–1993 era, greater importance was being placed throughout television on promotions (trailers) as a way of effectively detailing areas of the schedule to viewers who might not know about them. The 1993 invitation to tender for the provision of the Children's ITV service specified a minimum number of high quality trailers that the successful applicant must produce over the term of the contract. With a large promotions department - and a strong, highly credible reputation for presentation within the ITV network - the contract remained with Central.

On 15 February 1993, in-vision presentation was dropped by the first Network Centre Controller of Children's & Daytime Programming Dawn Airey (a former Central Management trainee) with Steven Ryde providing live out-of-vision continuity links featuring a wide variety of animated characters. On 6 September 1993, CITV was extended to start at 3:30 p.m., when the ITV network centre decided to move the pre-school children slot from 12:10 p.m., to be branded under the CITV in the afternoon slot. Around the same time, Children's ITV began to be informally referred to as CITV. However, the Children's was not removed from the logo until Monday 2 September 1996, the same month a digital on-screen graphic (DOG) was introduced.

Presentation for the service was moved in 1997 when Central moved into new, smaller studios at Gas Street Studios in Birmingham, which continued until Friday 22 May 1998. A new in-vision service was introduced on Tuesday 26 May 1998 by the new controller of ITV children's output, Nigel Pickard. Steven Ryde became a producer with Stephen Mulhern and Danielle Nicholls becoming the new presentation team. A new logo was introduced, designed by Aaron Camm (with traces of predecessors), and henceforth, Children's ITV became CITV, initially being broadcast from Studio B at Central's Gas Street Studios.

Central retained the contact to produce CITV for a further two years, seeing off two rival bids from other ITV companies. Shortly after launch, CITV started sharing studio space with the West Midlands edition of Central News in September 1999, allowing room for a large stylised set created by a company called Dorans Propmakers. The main studio for Central News West had previously been used for live music performances during CITV.

Cutbacks (2001–2009) 

During 2001, CITV's budget was cut by 17% due to the advertising recession, leading to CITV's controller Janie Grace publicly criticising Carlton and Granada Television, then the main controlling forces in the network, for underinvestment in ITV's children's service. Grace went even further and complained to the regulator ITC, claiming CITV was unlikely to fulfil its range of programming commitments in the following year. Grace also sought support from the ITC for the creation of a separate CITV Ltd company which would allow more children's output to be made in-house - a proposal which ultimately fell apart due to the need for a change in the law and support from the Office of Fair Trading. A new strand was introduced from 3:25 p.m. every afternoon and was put in place under the name "CITV's Telly Tots". The in-house presentation was dropped between 3:25 and 4:00 p.m. and replaced with a CGI animated town using a plane, car and a post box as mascots. A child voiceover was used to introduce its pre-school shows. Books and video tapes were introduced to tie-in with the new strand. Further cuts took place again during 2002 which brought the total cutback to 25% of the overall budget (£30 million less).

Despite the cutbacks, the ITC noted that CITV had a "sustained an impressive schedule", gave "factual material a fresh look" and "continued to produce good dramas" Just after CITV celebrated its 20th birthday in January 2003, Janie Grace resigned from the post, just before Nigel Pickard was named as ITV's new Director of Programmes. Pickard pledged to produce 80 more hours of children's programming in 2003, against a target of 520 hours in 2002 and extend the range of programmes to include more factual and topical programmes and more mixed entertainment and drama, Once again, concerns about CITV and its structure where highlighted by Angus Fletcher, president of Jim Henson Television Europe, and Anne Wood, founder of Ragdoll Productions, as it could only earn money from a then unreliable advertising market, unlike BBC Worldwide where the likes of Teletubbies, Tweenies, and Bob the Builder became key money earners for the corporation.

Steven Andrew took over as ITV's controller of children and youth, overseeing the merger of Carlton and Granada's children's departments. Andrew also began looking at the possibility of launching a CITV channel, which had previously been put on hold by budget cuts. On-screen, various changes to the continuity presenting team saw no less than eight additions and replacements in the space of four years. By 31 August 2004, all in-vision continuity was replaced by a voice over, while ITV plc announced the closure of its presentation and transmission facilities in Birmingham, signalling the end of CITV continuity from Central. Presentation was relocated to Granada in Manchester by November 2004.

Further cuts took place in 2005 due to the perceived rising costs of original production, the effects on advertising revenues following the ban by Ofcom on 'junk food' advertising within children's schedules from 2007, and increasing competition from CBBC and countless digital children's channels for new programmes (especially imported cartoons, typically from America). In summer 2006, ITV closed down its in-house children's production unit, as part of ITV's then on-going process of restructuring ITV Productions, and blaming the closure on the competitive production environment, though ITV denied any intention of ditching its children's programming from its network schedule. At the end of 2006, CITV's weekday afternoon strand on the main ITV network permanently came to an end, making the CITV channel, which had launched earlier that year, the main outlet for ITV's kids programming.
In July 2009, ITV announced it was the only channel to have an increased budget. Emma Tennant, the then controller of CITV, told the Showcomotion conference "The commissioning budgets for all channels next year are going to be smaller, except CITV, which is growing – but it will not necessarily spend the additional money on original commissions". It was also made clear due to tight budgets it may just lead to more acquisitions rather than new programmes being commissioned.

CITV channel 
The CITV channel was due to start in 2001 but was axed when CITV lost 25% of its budget. When Steven Andrew become controller of children and youth at ITV plc, he stated "No kids strategy is complete without us being able to play in the cable and satellite world. In fact, we can't not do this and ultimately survive as a kids player in the future". In early 2004, ITV finally confirmed it was planning to launch a children's channel, but as a joint venture. Charles Allen, chief executive of ITV plc, did not believe in ITV creating a new channel as it was already an over-populated market, with talk being held with Nickelodeon and Disney. The plans were dropped 12 months later with ITV instead using its own branding, and using spare Daytime capacity on new ITV4, channel being launch in the autumn of 2005. The original new channel, with Nickelodeon dubbed "INK" (ITV Nickelodeon Kids) - would have seen the two companies share programmes across each other's networks. Unfortunately each side failed to agree on the exact structure of the new venture and how it would be branded. ITV said We just got to the point of thinking that it was more sustainable for us to do it ourselves. The deal fizzled out over a period of time. Nickelodeon described the decision to end the talks as a "mutual backing away".

The original launch date of the channel was set for November 2005, to coincide with the launch of ITV4, but was held back until 11 February 2006. As a result of problems "clearing the digital rights to children's programming" and "comprehensive" rebranding, it was again pushed back by another four weeks. Promos for the channel began on 20 February, including an online countdown clock, running to the channel's launch date. As has become standard for Freeview channel launches, the channel was allocated an EPG number well before transmission started. Initially, a static 'coming soon' graphic was shown, followed by a preview video loop running from late February 2006 until the launch. The channel launched on 11 March 2006 at 9:25 a.m., replacing the ITV News Channel on Freeview Channel 75, Homechoice (now known as TalkTalk TV), and Telewest Channel 734. It also launched on Sky Channel 624 on 8 May 2006 and NTL Channel 76/602 on 6 June. Additionally, the channel simulcasts CITV Breakfast (previously known as GMTV2, which was originally broadcast on ITV2, then ITV4) on weekdays between 6 a.m. and 9:25 a.m..

The channel broadcasts daily from 6 a.m. to 6 p.m. and previously time-shared with ITV4 until 5 February 2008 when ITV4 expanded its broadcast hours to become a full 24-hour channel. As a consequence, it moved to the multiplex space on Freeview originally held by ABC1 from English and Scottish transmitters and S4C from Welsh transmitters, this meant that viewers of the latter were unable to receive the channel on Freeview unless they could receive transmissions from England. On 2 November 2009, the channel was relaunched, with a new logo and new branding to match ITV1 as part of ITV plc's corporate look. The channel's pre-school strand was given a dramatic overhaul, and renamed Mini CITV. Mini CITV is hosted by a group of spacemen-like beings called the Minis, who oversee presentation items on the channel. With the exception of weekends and holidays, Mini CITV took up the majority of output on the channel for a few years, though this was scaled back in 2012. On 9 January 2012, a change in the forward error correction mode on the multiplex allowed CITV to broadcast in Wales on Freeview. On 21 December 2012, the channel aired its first live programme since 2006, a 45-minute CITV special of Text Santa, ITV's Christmas charity appeal. A year later a series of 10-minute programmes titled Help for Hattitude in aid of the above-mentioned appeal was produced for the channel - both programmes were produced in-house by ITV Studios. A new look was introduced on 14 January 2013 to coincide with ITV's corporate rebranding. The channel adopted a "yellowy-orange" logo with playful idents that "burp and fart, and do other things kids love". On the weekend of Saturday 5 and Sunday 6 January 2013, CITV celebrated its thirty years of service with a marathon of archive programming, officially known as the Old Skool Weekend.

On 22 February 2016, CITV extended its on-air hours, the channel now finishes at 21:00 rather than the earlier 18:00.

On 11 April 2021, CITV's weekend morning block Scrambled! aired for the final time, marking the end of in-vision continuity on both CITV and ITV. CITV would continue to air on ITV on weekend mornings.

In March 2023, ITV plc announced that the CITV channel would close in late-2023; ITV will launch a children's content hub on its ITVX streaming service, "ITVX Kids", in July 2023, which will assume CITV's library and other children's content.

Programming 

Programming between 6:00 and 9:25 a.m. is controlled by ITV Breakfast (previously GMTV), who, having rebranded the vast majority of their GMTV children's output as CITV, now use the space to simulcast their programming at weekends on the ITV network and CITV Breakfast on weekdays. ITV takes over at 9:25 a.m., controlling the rest of the day's programming. When it first launched, GMTV used to sell all the airtime for the channel, making it the first ITV plc-owned channel not to be sold by the in-house sales team. Airtime sales have now been taken back in-house by ITV.

Some of the channel's most notable programming has been specially commissioned by CITV, such as Horrid Henry, Mr. Bean: The Animated Series, Grizzly Tales for Gruesome Kids, Thunderbirds Are Go, The Rubbish World of Dave Spud, and Sooty. A number of other programmes are sourced from other broadcasters in the UK and around the world.

Video games 
In the mid 2000s, CITV developed flash games, including the "Harry the Hamster" series and trilogy, where a bridge is built out of plastic pipes for Harry to cross the room in the first game of the series. In "Harry the Hamster 2: The Quest for the Golden Wheel", he searches for eight pieces scattered around a network of plastic pipes and other pathways to build his hamster wheel while trying to avoid running out of energy. Each collected piece refills the energy. In the three-dimensional game "Harry the Hamster 3: Rolling Rodent", he rolls through a garden inside a plastic ball and needs to stomp his enemies, which include frogs, spiders, garden gnomes, and wild rabbits.

Mini CITV 

Mini CITV, which was launched on 2 November 2009, was the slot that housed CITV's pre-school programming. It was aimed at preschool children. Between 2009 and 2012, Mini CITV was shown on weekdays in school term time between 8:45 a.m. to 3 p.m., and on weekends and school holidays between 6 a.m. to 7:25 a.m.. ITV broadcast Mini CITV on weekend mornings, there was also a block called The Fluffy Club between 2008 and 2010 on weekend mornings that housed preschool programmes and featured a puppet baby chick in between programmes. A series of little animated rabbit-like characters called the "Minis" were the mascots of the strand (similar to the bugs mascots of its rival CBeebies).

On 7 January 2013, the Mini CITV name and the Mini mascots were dropped from on-screen use and exactly one year later, on 7 January 2014, CITV removed all of its pre-school programmings from both its weekday and weekend schedules with the exception of Sooty, which continued to broadcast until 3 September 2018, after which it started broadcasting on ITVBe's new preschool block, LittleBe.

Ratings 
The CITV channel launched with a full-day average of 33,000 viewers and a 2.5% share of the child audience. This put it ahead of other channels Cartoon Network (20,000, a 1.5% share), Boomerang (28,000 a 2.1% share), and Nickelodeon (26,000 a 2.0% share). The channel peaked at 4:30 p.m. with Bratz gaining 51,000 viewers and a 3.6% share.

The channel took a 0.2% audience share in its first week compared to: CBBC 0.6%, Cartoon Network 0.4%, Boomerang 0.4%, and CBeebies 1.4%. Its overall ratings share for March 2006 was 0.1%; by April 2006 this had risen to 0.2%, 0.3% followed in May. In August 2006, the channel became the most popular commercial kids channel between 6 a.m. and 6 p.m.. On 6 January 2013, the CITV Channel received its highest viewing figures to date: Danger Mouse, which was shown as part of the Old Skool Weekend to celebrate CITV's 30th anniversary, attracted 578,000 viewers.

Footnotes

References

External links 
 

1981 establishments in the United Kingdom
Children's television channels in the United Kingdom
Children's television networks
ITV (TV network)
ITV television channels
Television channels and stations established in 2006
Television channels in the United Kingdom
Television programming blocks
2023 disestablishments in the United Kingdom
Television channels and stations disestablished in 2023